Henry Fraser may refer to:
 
Henry Paterson Fraser (1907–2001), British senior commander of Royal Air Force
Henry Morley Fraser (1922–2004), American football and baseball coach

See also

Harry Fraser (disambiguation)
Henry Frazer (disambiguation)